Kahduiyeh Rural District is in Garizat District of Taft County, Yazd province, Iran. At the National Census of 2006, its population was 1,133 in 332 households, when it was in Nir District. There were 1,049 inhabitants in 330 households at the following census of 2011, by which time it was in the newly formed Garizat District. At the most recent census of 2016, the population of the rural district was 881 in 298 households. The largest of its 18 villages was Kahduiyeh, with 589 people.

References 

Taft County

Rural Districts of Yazd Province

Populated places in Yazd Province

Populated places in Taft County